The 6th constituency of Bács-Kiskun County is one of the single member constituencies of the National Assembly, the national legislature of Hungary. The constituency standard abbreviation: Bács-Kiskun 06. OEVK.

Since 2014, it has been represented by Róbert Zsigó of the Fidesz–KDNP party alliance.

Geography
The 3rd constituency is located in south-western part of Bács-Kiskun County.

List of municipalities
The constituency includes the following municipalities:

Members
The constituency was first represented by Róbert Zsigó of the Fidesz from 2014, and he was re-elected in 2018 and 2022.

References

Bács-Kiskun 6th